Yvonne Yip Tsz-wa (also Yip Tsz-wa, ; born October 22, 1990) is a Hong Kong swimmer, who specialized in breaststroke events. Yip qualified for the women's 100 m breaststroke, as Hong Kong's youngest ever swimmer (aged 13), at the 2004 Summer Olympics in Athens. She set a new Hong Kong record and posted a FINA B-standard entry time of 1:13.02 from the Asian Age Group Championships in her home venue. She challenged seven other swimmers in heat two, including 15-year-old Alia Atkinson, who later became Jamaica's top swimmer. She edged out Iceland's Íris Edda Heimisdóttir to claim a seventh spot by 0.82 of a second, outside her record time of 1:14.53. Yip failed to advance into the semifinals, as she placed thirty-ninth overall in the preliminaries.

References

External links
 HK Swim Bio 

1990 births
Living people
Hong Kong female breaststroke swimmers
Olympic swimmers of Hong Kong
Swimmers at the 2004 Summer Olympics
Swimmers at the 2006 Asian Games
Asian Games competitors for Hong Kong